The papal conclave held on 1 and 2 March 1939 saw Cardinal Eugenio Pacelli elected on the third ballot to succeed Pius XI, who had died on 10 February, as pope. All 62 cardinals took part. Pacelli, who had been camerlengo and secretary of state, took the name Pius XII. The day was his 63rd birthday.

The conclave of 1939 was the shortest of the 20th century. It was also the last to include all living cardinals.

Pacelli was the first member of the Roman Curia to become pope since Gregory XVI (1831) and the first Roman since Innocent XIII (1721).

Papabili
Time magazine announced that likely contenders for the papacy included August Hlond of Gniezno-Poznań, Karl Joseph Schulte of Cologne, the Curia veteran Eugène-Gabriel-Gervais-Laurent Tisserant, Ildefonso Schuster of Milan, Adeodato Giovanni Piazza of Venice, Maurilio Fossati of Turin, and Eugenio Pacelli, a longtime diplomat in the service of the Holy See.  The prospect of a non-Italian pope for the first time since  Adrian VI in 1522 was considered more likely than in previous conclaves. On 13 February, The New York Times dismissed the idea of a non-Italian given the current state of international hostilities, though it thought Jean-Marie-Rodrigue Villeneuve of Quebec the least objectionable to the contending powers. It discounted Pacelli since there was no precedent for the election of the secretary of state, and precedent argued against the election of any member of the Curia as well as three key Italians who were members of religious orders. The five Italians remaining were Alessio Ascalesi of Naples, Giovanni Nasalli Rocca di Corneliano of Bologna, Luigi Lavitrano of Palermo, Maurilio Fossati of Turin, and Elia dalla Costa of Florence. By 20 February the paper found greater interest in the curial cardinals, Francesco Marmaggi, Massimo Massimi, and Luigi Maglione.

Pacelli was heavily favored among the cardinals to win. Pius XI had hinted that he favored Pacelli as his successor. On 15 December 1937, during his last consistory, Pius XI strongly hinted to the cardinals that he expected Pacelli to be his successor, saying "He is in your midst." He had previously been quoted as saying: "When today the Pope dies, you'll get another one tomorrow, because the Church continues. It would be a much bigger tragedy, if Cardinal Pacelli dies, because there is only one. I pray every day, God may send another one into one of our seminaries, but as of today, there is only one in this world."

Like Pius X, Pius XI had been a blunt-spoken, no-nonsense pontiff. Assembling in 1939 as the outbreak of hostilities that became the Second World War was widely anticipated, the cardinals turned to a soft-spoken diplomat.

Balloting
Pacelli, in his role as Camerlengo, announced on 10 February that the College would wait the maximum time allowed, eighteen days from the death of the pope, to start the conclave. The time period before starting had been lengthened following the previous conclave, for which three North American cardinals had arrived too late to participate. When the 31 cardinals available discussed the question on 11 February, they amended his plan only to provide that they would start earlier if all those who planned to attend had arrived in Rome. The cardinals arrived slowly in Rome, with just 37 attending the papal funeral on 14 February and 46 at a funeral Mass on 18 February. By 20 February, starting the conclave on 28 February appeared to be a possibility, as only three non-Italians had yet to arrive: William Henry O'Connell of Boston, Sebastião da Silveira Cintra of Rio de Janeiro, and Santiago Copello of Buenos Aires. On 22 February the cardinals sitting in general congregation settled on 1 March, expecting the three to arrive at Naples on the S.S. Neptunia on that morning.

The conclave was held in the Apostolic Palace. All the cardinals attended, 35 Italians and 27 from other countries. The doors closed at 6:17 pm.

Pacelli won a narrow victory on the second ballot with the lowest possible two-thirds majority, 42 out of 62. He then asked for an additional ballot to confirm his election by a larger margin. To the question "Acceptasne electionem de te canonice factam in Summum Pontificem?", Pacelli replied "Accepto in crucem" (I accept it as a cross). He explained his choice of Pius by saying, "I call myself Pius; my whole life was under Popes with this name, but especially as a sign of gratitude towards Pius XI."

The white smoke signifying a successful election appeared at 5:30 pm, but began to turn black. Vincenzo Santoro, the conclave secretary, then sent a note to Vatican Radio to confirm that the smoke was white and Pacelli had been elected. At 6:06 pm, the Protodeacon, Cardinal Camillo Caccia-Dominioni, made the Habemus Papam announcement in Latin from the balcony of St. Peter's Basilica. He said that the new pope had chosen the name Pius and did not mention the ordinal "the twelfth". The crowd below in St. Peter's Square began to sing the hymn Christus Vincit.

Change in conclave procedure
Pius had been narrowly elected before seeking an additional ballot to demonstrate wider support, and he knew that a very close ballot in the 1914 conclave had raised the question of the impact of a cardinal's vote for himself. Pius promulgated the apostolic constitution Vacantis Apostolicae Sedis on 8 December 1945, more than six years after his election. He made only two significant changes in conclave procedures, otherwise following those established by Pope Pius X on 25 December 1904 with the constitution Vacante Sede Apostolica. (1) He increased the majority required for election from two-thirds of those voting to two-thirds plus one, so that an elector's vote for himself would be insufficient to produce a two-thirds majority. He also eliminated the rule against voting for oneself, which the two-thirds-plus-one rule obviated. It holds, though, that if one had an exact two-thirds majority, not counting one's own vote, a cardinal could cast the deciding vote for himself. (2) From 1621 to 1945, the ballots were signed with folded over flaps to conceal the signatures of the electors.  Pius XII removed the signature portion of the new form of ballot, so that a completely secret ballot is now cast by each elector with the oath taken at the same moment, now being anonymous.  All this is clearly stated in the Apostolic Constitution "Vancantis Apostolicae Sedis" promulgated by Pius XII on 8 December 1945.

See also
Cardinal electors for the 1939 papal conclave

Notes

References

Sources

External links

 
1939 elections in Europe
1939 in Italy
20th-century Catholicism
1939 in Christianity
March 1939 events
Political history of Vatican City